Party of crooks and thieves ( – Partiya zhulikov i vorov, abbr.  – PZhiV) is an expression widely circulating among opposition in Russia which is used to refer to the ruling United Russia party, led by Dmitry Medvedev and Vladimir Putin. It was coined by blogger and anti-corruption activist Alexei Navalny in February 2011.

Origin
In 2013 far-right politician Vladimir Zhirinovsky, speaking to Echo of Moscow, claimed to have used this expression in 2009. In 2010 liberal politician Boris Nemtsov, speaking to Radio Liberty, described United Russia as "a party of thieves and corrupt officials".

On February 2, 2011, in an interview with Finam FM radio station, blogger and anti-corruption activist Alexei Navalny responded to the question about United Russia:

The English translation "party of crooks and thieves" first appeared in an article of The New Yorker on April 4, 2011, by Russian-born American journalist Julia Ioffe. The expression was also used by The Economist in October and December 2011.

Usage
The slogan was widely used during the 2011 Russian legislative election campaign by parties and individuals.

Posters, banners, stickers were common during the protests in 2011 and 2012.

While reporting about the two sessions, i.e. National People's Congress and Chinese People's Political Consultative Conference, CGTN Russian, a Russian-language Chinese media platform used the term in its video to introduce China's efforts to contain corruption.

Public opinion
A Levada Center survey on July 19, 2011, revealed that 33% of Russians agree that United Russia is a "party of crooks and thieves", while 47% disagreed. Another survey by the same center in June 2012 showed an increase in respondents agreeing with the characterization. Of the total, 47% agreed and 40% disagreed. The latest survey was conducted in April 2013 by Levada Center. For the first time since 2011, it showed the majority of Russians (51%) agreeing with the phrase. At the same poll, 62% of Russian said United Russia members are about "maintaining and strengthening their own power."

In February 2011, Navalny created a poll in his LiveJournal blog in which around 38,000 people participated with over 96% agreeing with the characterization of United Russia as "party of crooks and thieves".

Reaction from United Russia
On October 11, 2011, the Lyublinsky District Court rejected the lawsuit of United Russia member Vladimir Svirid against Navalny.

On November 24, 2011, during a debate on Russia-1, State Duma Member Alexander Khinshtein (a member of United Russia) stated:

See also

 Kleptocracy
 List of political slogans

References

External links
 Net Impact. One man’s cyber-crusade against Russian corruption. – The New Yorker, the first article about the popular expression in western media

Russian political phrases
Corruption in Russia
United Russia
Alexei Navalny
2011 neologisms